Ayesha Disa Curry (née Alexander; born March 23, 1989) is a Canadian-American actress, cookbook author, cooking television personality, and the wife of basketball player Stephen Curry. After guest roles in several television shows and movies, she began hosting her own show, Ayesha's Homemade ( Ayesha's Home Kitchen), on Food Network. Despite not having any professional chef training, her culinary career started in 2014, when she prepared her first meal as a YouTube demonstration on her channel Little Lights of Mine. Curry is the author of several videos on her channel Little Lights of Mine and has written two cookbooks, The Seasoned Life, published in 2016, and The Full Plate, published in 2020.

Career 
At age 12, Curry acted as the love interest in the music video for "Too Young for Love" by Suga Prince (now known as Sevn Thomas).

After graduating from Weddington High School, Curry moved to Los Angeles to become an actress, appearing, mostly, in bit parts. She appeared in a short film Underground Street Flippers (2009), the TV movie Dan's Detour of Life (2008), and in the direct to DVD movie Love for Sale (2008).

After her marriage she started a food blog, and then a YouTube channel. This led to a short lived Food Network show Ayesha's Homemade that was canceled after 13 episodes. In addition to her written recipes, Curry often posts instructional cooking videos on her YouTube channel.

In 2016, she released her cookbook "The Seasoned Life." She also began starring in Ayesha's Homemade, which follows her professional and personal life with cameos from her husband and two daughters. The first season ran for six episodes. A second season of six episodes, named Ayesha's Home Kitchen premiered on Food Network on April 30, 2017.

On September 20, 2017, Curry was named as a spokesperson for CoverGirl, becoming the first spokesperson for the brand who is not an actress or singer. She was announced on September 21, 2017, as one of the new hosts of The Great American Baking Show, an American adaptation of The Great British Bake Off, on ABC. She also revealed to Deidre Behar, from Entertainment Tonight, that she was approached to join the next season of Dancing With The Stars. Only two episodes of the third season of Baking Show, however, aired on television due to sexual harassment allegations against one of the show's judges outside the series. While the show was renewed for a fourth season, Curry did not return as a host and was succeeded by former Spice Girls member Emma Bunton.

In July 2019, Curry and her husband launched the "Eat. Learn. Play. Foundation" in Oakland, California. The foundation works to end childhood hunger, increase access to quality education, and provide safe spaces for children to stay active.

Restaurant and food business 
Her 2014 company Little Lights of Mine sold its own brand of extra virgin olive oil, and 10% of all proceeds are donated to the charity No Kid Hungry.

In 2016, Curry collaborated with chef Michael Mina in The Mina Test Kitchen of International Smoke, a Bay Area pop-up restaurant. In July 2019, the Mina/Curry International Smoke restaurant opened another location at One Paseo in Carmel Valley, San Diego.

In 2017, Curry started Homemade, the Oakland-based meal-kit delivery service, turned (in 2019) retail store pop-up.

In April 2020, Curry launched Sweet July, a brand consisting of a lifestyle magazine, brick-and-mortar store, and product line. In September 2020, she launched her television and film production company Sweet July Productions, with a first-look deal at Entertainment One.

Personal life 
Ayesha is the daughter of John and Carol Alexander (née Chin) and has four siblings: Maria, Janiece, Jaz and Chad. Her mother is of Afro-Jamaican and Chinese-Jamaican descent while her father is of mixed African-American and Polish descent. She was born and raised in Toronto until the age of 14, when she moved to Charlotte, North Carolina. She first gained an interest in cooking at a young age. With her mother operating a salon in the basement of their home, Ayesha would watch as her babysitter cooked Trinidadian curry and roti and brought it down to customers.

On July 30, 2011, she married NBA player Stephen Curry. The two had met in a church youth group in Charlotte when they were 15 and 14 years old. They did not start dating until years later when Ayesha was pursuing her acting career in Hollywood and Stephen was visiting for an awards show. Ayesha soon moved back to Charlotte close to where Stephen was playing college basketball at Davidson College. Together, they have three children. As of 2019, they reside in Atherton, California.

Curry is a Christian; of her faith, she said: "It's the foundation for everything that I do, really. … With my relationship with my husband, it's what it's founded on." She added that "[W]hen Steph decided to play basketball, I had the same conversation with him that he had with me. 'Whatever you do, do it well, but do it for God.' I think that's what has kept us grounded. When I started my blog called 'Little Lights of Mine,' my whole goal was to do the things I wanted to do, but all while being a light for Him."

Filmography

Acting

As herself

References

External links 
 
 
Ayesha Curry Cooks Up Dishes with Jennifer Aniston and Ellen

1989 births
Living people
21st-century American actresses
21st-century American women writers
21st-century Canadian actresses
21st-century Canadian women writers
Actresses from Charlotte, North Carolina
Actresses from Toronto
African-American actresses
African-American Christians
African-American television personalities
African-American women writers
American actresses of Chinese descent
American bloggers
American cookbook writers
American Internet celebrities
American people of Jamaican descent
American people of Polish descent
American television actresses
American television chefs
American women bloggers
American writers of Chinese descent
American YouTubers
Black Canadian actresses
Black Canadian writers
Canadian actresses of Chinese descent
Canadian bloggers
Canadian Christians
Canadian cookbook writers
Canadian emigrants to the United States
Canadian expatriate actresses in the United States
Canadian Internet celebrities
Canadian people of African-American descent
Canadian people of Jamaican descent
Canadian people of Polish descent
Canadian television actresses
Canadian television chefs
Canadian television personalities
Canadian women bloggers
Canadian women television personalities
Canadian YouTubers
Curry family
Food Network chefs
Women cookbook writers
Writers from Charlotte, North Carolina
Writers from Toronto